The second season of The Real Housewives of Melbourne, an Australian reality television series, was broadcast on Arena. It aired from 22 February 2015, until 17 May 2015, and was primarily filmed in Melbourne, Victoria. Its executive producers are Kylie Washington and Lisa Potasz.

The Real Housewives of Melbourne focuses on the lives of Jackie Gillies, Chyka Keebaugh, Gina Liano, Janet Roach, Lydia Schiavello, Pettifleur Berenger, and Gamble Breaux; It consisted of thirteen episodes.

Production and crew

Season two of The Real Housewives of Melbourne was officially commissioned 8 May 2014, prior to the conclusion of season one. Filming for the season had begun by August 2014.
On 7 December 2014, the full cast and premiere date were announced.
A trailer depicting the returning wives picking up the new wives from an airport was released on 2 February 2015. The trailer featured a cover of These Boots Are Made for Walkin' by Australian artist Marcia Hines, recorded specifically for the trailer.

The series premiere "Fresh Start, New Faces" was aired on 22 February 2015, while the eleventh episode "Wonderland" served as the season finale, and was aired on 3 May 2015.
It was followed by a two-part reunion which marked the conclusion of the season and was broadcast on 10 May and 17 May 2015.

Kylie Washington and Lisa Potasz are recognized as the series' executive producers, and Euan Jones, Virginia Hodgson, Philippa Rubira are recognized as series' producers. It is produced by Matchbox Pictures, and distributed by NBCUniversal International Television Production.

Cast and synopsis
Five of the six housewives featured on the first season returned for the second installment.
Prior to the  conclusion of season one, cast member Andrea Moss expressed doubts in return for the second installment as she was taken aback by how publicised they had become saying, "It’s not what I expected. There’s a lot more attention on us. It’s a whole lot bigger than I ever thought (it would be)." Upon announcing the new season, Brian Walsh, Foxtel executive director of television, announced the departure of Moss revealing it was her decision to leave the show. Walsh spoke on behalf of production in wish Moss well and that they understand her decisions in leaving the show.

With the departure of Moss, The Real Housewives of Melbourne saw the introduction of two new full-time wives, Pettifleur Berenger and Gamble Breaux.

Breaux is a former art consultant, who now follows her passion of painting, is described as someone who marches to the beat of her woman drum as well as being quirky and entertaining. The former model is originally from Sydney, but now lives in Melbourne with her husband Dr. Richard Wolfe, one of Australia's respected cataract and laser refractive eye surgeons, along with her step-son, in their Mornington Peninsula home. In Sydney, Breaux worked as an art consultant for many places, which includes the Billich Gallery that is owned by Charles Billich. Now in Melbourne, Breaux spends her timing going for jogs, getting botox, designing her handbag range, and spoiling her Pomeranians, Cash and Wicket.

Berenger is a Sri Lankan-born property developer who is an aspiring author of her first book, Switch the Bitch. Berenger is described as determined, feisty and glamorous as well as somebody who lives the high life in more ways than one. Born in Sri Lanka, Berenger moved to Australia in her teenage years and settled in Melbourne. She describes herself as having Swiss, Portuguese, Dutch and Ceylonese ancestry. Since migrating to Australia, Berenger has gone on to work as property manager and runs her own property management business. She has been married twice and has three sons whose ages range between twelve and thirteen, and has been dating for eight years a man called Frank, whom she regards as her rock, soul mate and travelling companion.

Also featured in season two is recurring cast member, Manuela Pless-Bennett. Pless-Bennet is the first "friend of the housewives" to be featured in  The Real Housewives of Melbourne and was featured in interviews and attended the reunion.
Pless-Bennet is a Melbourne native who is described as someone with a sharp, creative, entrepreneurial mind, as well as a person who makes success of everything she puts her hand to. Pless-Bennet was educated in Melbourne as well as Switzerland and Los Angeles, which led to her shaping her career to be an international model that lasted for over a decades as well as working in several countries. Pless-Bennet moved to Los Angeles, where she stopped modelling and dedicated her time to journalism, which she studied at UCLA, and working towards her college credit as an intern on the Paramount Pictures lot at Entertainment Tonight, as well as the Los Angeles headquarters for channel 7 and channel 9. After college, Pless-Bennet pursued her passion of journalism which led to many jobs that included radio, live shows and television. Pless-Bennet landed her dream job at the time, hosting a prime-time television show which led her moving back to Australia. Away from journalism, Pless-Bennet has a passion for property, having sold, bought, renovated, and built many homes across Australia.

Reception

U.S. ratings
The Real Housewives of Melbourne returned to Bravo for its second season on 5 March 2015, this time being upgraded to a prime-time time slot on, compared to its first season being airing during noon on Sundays. Season two of the series aired in the U.S. just two week after its Australian premiere. The second-season premiere, grew on the prior season's premiere attracting 534,000 viewers, whereas season one premiered attracted an approximately 414,000 total viewers.

Awards
In 2015, The Real Housewives of Melbourne season two was nominated for Best Reality Television Series in the fifth Australian Academy of Cinema and Television Arts Awards, however the series was beaten by MasterChef Australia.

Taglines
Chyka: "Style is an attitude, not something you can buy."
Gamble: "Gamble on me and you’re sure to win."
Gina: "I deal in fact not friction."
Jackie: "Make light of me all you want, but I’m still going to shine!"
Janet: "Some people have ups and downs- I have roller coaster rides!"
Lydia: "I love tradition but I’m no traditional housewife."
Pettifleur: "This little flower is no shrinking violet!"

Episodes

Home media release
The second season was released on DVD in region 4 on 16 November 2015.

References

External links

 
 
 

The Real Housewives of Melbourne
2015 Australian television seasons